Bellbird may refer to:

Birds
 Neotropical bellbird (genus Procnias), of South and Central America
 Crested bellbird (Oreoica gutturalis), of Australia
 New Zealand bellbird (Anthornis melanura)
 Bell miner (Manorina melanophrys), colloquially known in Australia as the bellbird

Other uses
 Bellbird, New South Wales, Australia
 Bellbird (TV series), a 1967-1977 Australian TV production
 Bellbird (film), a 2019 New Zealand film by director Hamish Bennett